John Marshall Metropolitan High School (commonly known as simply Marshall) is a public 4–year high school located in the East Garfield Park neighborhood on the west side of Chicago, Illinois, United States. Opened in 1895, Marshall is operated by the Chicago Public Schools district. Marshall is named in honor of John Marshall, the fourth Chief Justice of the Supreme Court of the United States. Marshall serves the students of the East Garfield Park, West Garfield Park, North Lawndale and Humboldt Park neighborhoods.

Background
The student body is approximately 98% African American. Marshall High school is a Title I high school as determined by U.S. Department of Education standards, meaning that 40% or more of the students come from families that qualify as low income under United States Census definitions. The school is perhaps best known for its association with the sport of basketball. Both its boys' and girls' teams have shown success at the state level. John Marshall has a history of excelling in other sports and academics as well: Baseball, football, fencing, track and field, Liberal Arts Major, Honors Math and Science courses.

Athletics
Marshall competes in the Chicago Public League (CPL) and is a member of the Illinois High School Association (IHSA).  The school sport teams are stylized as the Commandos. The following teams finished in the top four of their respective IHSA sponsored state championship tournament: The boys' track and field placed in 3rd in 1960–61. Marshall has won eight state championships, has finished in the top four in state 18 times, and has made 24 appearances in the state final tournament; all of which are records for the state of Illinois.

Basketball
The boys' basketball team has won the state championship three times (1957–58, 1959–60, 2007–08), has four times placed 3rd (1960–61, 1990–91, 2005–06, 2006–07), and twice finished 4th (1981–82, 1982–83). Courtney Hargrays, the head coach of the 07 championship team, is the only coach to win the Chicago city title and state title in his first year. The school's team figures prominently in the 1994 documentary film Hoop Dreams. The Marshall girls' basketball team has been state champions ten times (1981–82, 1984–85, 1988–89, 1989–90, 1991–92, 1992–93, 1998–99, 2007–08, 2017–18, 2018–19) and runners-up three times (1979–80, 1985–86, 1993–94) in addition to placing 3rd six times (1980–81, 1982–83, 1987–88, 1996–97, 1997–98, 2008–09) and 4th in 1983–84.

Notable alumni

 Harvey Jack Schiller (1963) - Ran the fastest 440 yard dash of any high school student in America (46.0).  Went on to earn separate PhDs in Mathematics, Physiology, and Chemical Engineering, and an MBA (The University of Chicago).  Developed theory of Evolution of Intelligence.  Developed theory of Mathematical Endocrinology.  Optimized  process for large-scale synthesis of artificial DNA.   Developed algorithm for super-fast solution of Linear Programs.
 Arthur Agee (1991) – former Chicago-area basketball player, best known for being profiled in documentary film Hoop Dreams<ref>{{Citation| last = Smith| first = Darius| title = Marshall's Darius Smith reviews 'Hoop Reality'| newspaper = Chicago Tribune| date = 26 March 2009| url = http as://www.chicagotribune.com/sports/highschool/chi-090326-hoop-reality-movie-review,0,4764983.story| access-date = 21 January 2010| quote = Follow-up to "Hoop Dreams, the documentary that won the Sundance Audience Award in 1994 with its depiction of Marshall star Arthur Agee and St. Joseph's William Gates attempting to better their lives through basketball.}}</ref>
 Alfonzo McKinnie (2010) - NBA player, most notably for the Golden State Warriors.
 Patrick Beverley (2006) – NBA player, formerly for the Los Angeles Clippers and Houston Rockets, and currently for the Chicago Bulls.
 Jerome Isaac Friedman (1948) – physicist awarded 1990 Nobel Prize in Physics for his work that led to the discovery of quarks
Larry Friend – National Basketball Association (NBA) player 
 Larry Gelbart (attended) – Tony and Emmy Award-winning writer
 Stuart M. Kaminsky (1953) – mystery writer who wrote novels
 William J. Keester (1907) – Rear Admiral in the United States Coast Guard
Cleve Killingsworth (1966) – served as Chairman, President, and CEO of Blue Cross and Blue Shield of MA
 Benjamin Libet – Pioneering scientist in the field of human consciousness
 Peter Lisagor (1934) –  journalist who served as Washington DC bureau chief for the Chicago Daily News (1959–76)
 Dr. Harry Martin (1908) – medical director of 20th Century Fox Studios
 Shauneille Perry (1946), stage director, playwright, and actress
 Cappie Pondexter (2002) – All-Star WNBA guard, playing for Chicago Sky
 Julius B. Richmond – (1935) 12th Surgeon General of the United States (1977–81)
 Edward Ricketts (1914) – Marine biologist, inspiration for the character "Doc" in John Steinbeck's Cannery Row
Hyman G. Rickover (1918) – Admiral in the United States Navy, described as  "Father of the Nuclear Navy,"
 Vincent Starrett – news reporter and author
 Darryl Stingley (1970) – NFL wide receiver (1973–77), played his entire pro career with New England Patriots
 Carleton Washburne (attended) – author and prominent proponent of progressive education
 George Wilson (1960) – former NBA center (1964–71)

Notable staff
 Dorothy Gaters – Girls basketball coach at the school since 1975. She has led the team to over 900 victories, and in 2009 became the third girls' basketball coach to receive the Morgan Wooten Lifetime Achievement Award from the Naismith Memorial Basketball Hall of Fame.

References

External links
 

Public high schools in Chicago
Educational institutions established in 1895
1895 establishments in Illinois